Kongiganak is a census-designated place (CDP) in Bethel Census Area, Alaska, United States, and primarily sits on the eastern shore of the Kongiganak River. As of the 2010 census, the population was 439, up from 359 in 2000.

Geography
Kongiganak is located at  (59.953896, -162.895199).

History

The original Kongiganak was settled in the 19th century and was located on a small creek just above Kuskokwim Bay. In 1880, it was called "Kongiganagamute" and had a population of 175 Inuit. The site was later abandoned. It is located a few miles east of present-day Kwigillingok and about 9 miles southeast of the current Kongiganak.

The current Kongiganak was permanently settled in the 1960s when former residents of Kwigillingok sought higher ground in search of relief from floods.

It is served by Kongiganak Airport.

Demographics

The current settlement of Kongiganak first appeared on the 1970 U.S. Census as an unincorporated village. In 1980, it was reclassified as a census-designated place (CDP).

As of the census of 2000, there were 359 people, 79 households, and 60 families residing in the CDP. There were 90 housing units at an average density of 53.3/sq mi (20.6/km2). The racial makeup of the CDP was 2.79% White, 95.82% Native American, and 1.39% from two or more races.  1.67% of the population were Hispanic or Latino of any race.

There were 79 households, out of which 55.7% had children under the age of 18 living with them, 59.5% were married couples living together, 11.4% had a female householder with no husband present, and 22.8% were non-families. 21.5% of all households were made up of individuals, and none had someone living alone who was 65 years of age or older.  The average household size was 4.54 and the average family size was 5.52.

In the CDP, the population was spread out, with 43.2% under the age of 18, 10.0% from 18 to 24, 27.3% from 25 to 44, 16.7% from 45 to 64, and 2.8% who were 65 years of age or older.  The median age was 22 years. For every 100 females, there were 120.2 males.  For every 100 females age 18 and over, there were 112.5 males.

The median income for a household in the CDP was $33,250, and the median income for a family was $34,750. Males had a median income of $21,875 versus $30,625 for females. The per capita income for the CDP was $9,881.  About 19.4% of families and 13.8% of the population were below the poverty line, including 10.3% of those under age 18 and none of those age 65 or over.

Education

Kongiganak is served by one school in the Lower Kuskokwim School District, Ayagina'ar Elitnaurvik.  it serves 174 students between grades P and 12. As of 2014 the student count was 177. The Wolverines are the school mascot.

References

Census-designated places in Bethel Census Area, Alaska
Census-designated places in Alaska
Census-designated places in Unorganized Borough, Alaska